The Digitalian (stylized as THE DIGITALIAN) is the thirteenth studio album of the Japanese boy band Arashi. The album was released on October 22, 2014 under their record label J Storm in two editions: a first press/limited edition and a regular edition. The regular edition comes with a 32-page photo lyrics booklet, while the limited edition comes with a 60-page photo lyrics booklet and a bonus DVD with a music video and making-of for "Zero-G". The album sold over 660,000 copies in its first week and became the third best selling album of 2014 in Japan. With more than 780,000 units sold, the album was certified for Triple Platinum by the Recording Industry Association of Japan (RIAJ).

It was released digitally on February 7, 2020.

Album information
The first press edition contains a CD with sixteen tracks and the regular edition contains a CD with seventeen tracks. The first press edition comes with a 60-page photo lyrics booklet and a bonus DVD with the music video and making of for "Zero-G", while the regular edition comes with a 32-page lyrics booklet and a bonus track. The album jacket cover for both versions are also different.

Songs
"The Digitalian" includes three of the group's previously released singles: "Bittersweet", "Guts!", and "Daremo Shiranai". This album also includes nine new songs plus five of each member's solo songs.

Three tracks of this album were used as the theme song for dramas starred by the Arashi members. These songs are "Bittersweet", "Guts!", and "Daremo Shiranai", used in dramas Shitsuren Chocolatier, Yowakutemo Katemasu, and Shinigami-kun, respectively.

Promotion
To support their new album, Arashi performed a live tour, Arashi Live Tour 2014 The Digitalian, performing at all the major dome stadiums in Japan. They had 18 performances beginning on November 14 at the Fukuoka Dome, followed by Kyocera Osaka Dome on November 27, Nagoya Dome on December 5, Sapporo Dome on December 12, and Tokyo Dome on December 19, 2014.

Track listing

Release history

References

External links
product information
October 2014 Hard Copy Sales Certifications Recording Industry Association of Japan (RIAJ)

2014 albums
Arashi albums
Japanese-language albums
J Storm albums